Marc Haydel Morial  (born January 3, 1958) is an American political and civic leader and the current president of the National Urban League. Morial served as Mayor of New Orleans from 1994 to 2002  as the city's youngest Mayor, President of the United States Conference of Mayors in 2001, and as a Louisiana State Senator from 1992 to 1994.

Morial was born in New Orleans, Louisiana. After completing his undergraduate degree at the University of Pennsylvania in 1980 and receiving his Juris Doctor from Georgetown University Law Center  in 1983, he began his career as a lawyer in New Orleans and in 1985 he established a private law practice there.

In 2021, Harvard University published a case study, profiling Morial, called Embracing the Uphill Struggle: Marc Morial's Quest for Corporate Diversity.

Early life and education 
Marc Morial was born January 3, 1958, to Ernest N. "Dutch" Morial and Sybil (Haydel) Morial, an elementary school teacher, Xavier University of New Orleans dean and civic activist. He is the second of five children. He was raised in Pontchartrain Park, a subdivision of New Orleans.

Morial went on to graduate Jesuit High School in New Orleans as a member of the National Honor Society. He was one of only 14 Black students of 1,000 at Jesuit High School, he founded the Student Association for Black Achievement, and organized the school's first Black History Month celebration.

Morial was included in Who’s Who Among High School Students and Who’s Who in America and Outstanding Young Men of America in high school.

In 1980 Morial earned a bachelor's degree in economics and African American studies at the University of Pennsylvania in Philadelphia.

Morial earned a Juris Doctor degree in 1983 from Georgetown University in Washington, D.C. At Georgetown, he was elected first-year Delegate to the Student Bar Association and served as a member and head of fundraising for the National Black Law Students Association.

Early career
After working during his third year in law school for the late U.S. Rep. Mickey Leland, he returned to New Orleans to join the firm Barham and Churchill.

In 1985, Morial established a private law practice in New Orleans.

After a narrow defeat in his first race for public office for Louisiana second congressional district, Morial was elected as Louisiana State senator in 1991 where he served until 1994 before being elected Mayor of New Orleans.

State senator 
As a Louisiana State Senator (1992–94), Morial was Chairman of the Educational Institution Subcommittee; and member of the Louisiana Legislative Black Caucus.

Mayor of New Orleans 
Marc Morial was elected Mayor of New Orleans, Louisiana in 1994 by defeating Donald Mintz with 54% of the vote.  He’s the youngest person elected Mayor of New Orleans in 50 years and at the time, one of the youngest mayors of a major American city. He campaigned with the promise to "clean out City Hall with a shovel not a broom."

Morial won re-election to a second term in 1998, receiving 80% of the votes.

During his time as Mayor, the rate of violent crime in New Orleans fell by 50%."

From 2001 to 2002, Morial was President of the United States Conference of Mayors.

Conference of Mayors 

Morial was elected President of the United States Conference of Mayors by membership and served as chief spokesperson for America’s Cities (2001–02). In addition to his time as President, he also served as the organization’s Chairman for the Committee on Arts, Chairman for the Federal Budget Task Force, and Chairman for the Task Force on Hunger and Homelessness, and Vice President, among other positions.

National Urban League 

In 2003, Morial was selected to head the National Urban League.

In 2004, Morial added a new metric, the Equality Index, to the League's annual State of Black America.

Personal life 
Marc Morial is married to CBS journalist Michelle Miller, whom he married at St Louis Cathedral in New Orleans. They have two children. 

On his maternal side, Morial is cousin to civil rights activist Curtis Graves and his daughter Gizelle Bryant.

Morial is Catholic.

Publications 
Morial has written two non-fiction books, published speeches, weekly newspaper columns and a weekly newsletter, “ReMarcs” for the National Urban League.

 “A National Action Plan for America’s Cities,” The Urban Lawyer: The National Quarterly on State and Local Government Law, Volume 34 Number 3, Summer 2002.
 “Decisions of Courage,” a Book of Speeches by Mayor Marc H. Morial from his first term as Mayor of New Orleans. 1998
 “To Be Equal,” a weekly newspaper column. 2003 – Present
 The Gumbo Coalition - 2020

Presidential Commissions 
Morial served as Chair of the Census Advisory Committee (2010), and a member President’s Advisory Council on Financial Capability (2012-2015). He was also appointed to the Twenty-First Century Workforce Commission by President Bill Clinton (1998-2000).

References

External links

 
 
 Marc Morial interview, Tavis Smiley show

|-

|-

|-

1958 births
Living people
African-American mayors in Louisiana
African-American state legislators in Louisiana
Louisiana Creole people
Mayors of New Orleans
Democratic Party Louisiana state senators
Jesuit High School (New Orleans) alumni
University of Pennsylvania alumni
Georgetown University Law Center alumni
New York (state) Democrats
American civil rights activists
American anti-racism activists
Minority rights activists
Presidents of the United States Conference of Mayors
African-American Catholics
21st-century African-American people
Roman Catholic activists
20th-century African-American people